South Bekasi is one of the twelve districts (kecamatan) within the municipality of Bekasi, in Jabodetabek (Jakarta's metropolitan area) on the island of Java, Indonesia. Administratively it is divided into five administrative villages (kelurahan): Jaka Mulya (Jakamulya) (273 Ha) with 37,410 inhabitants in 2020, Jaka Setia (Jakasetia) (330 Ha) with 42,2700 inhabitants in 2020, Kayuringin Jaya (368 Ha) with 56,519 inhabitants in 2020, Marga Jaya (Margajaya) (209 Ha) with 16,337 inhabitants in 2020, and Pekayon Jaya (425 Ha) with 58,269 inhabitants in 2020. Public schools were started in the district in 1994. As of 2013 all of the villages had health centres except for Jaka Setia.

Geography
South Bekasi lies in the lowlands with elevations from 0 to 25 metres. The area is flat lying with an average slope of 2%, and is subject to flooding during and after heavy rains.

References

External links
 

Populated places in West Java
Districts of West Java